Bush Highway is a scenic highway in the US state of Arizona. It begins at the northern end of Power Road in Mesa and extends northeasterly through the Tonto National Forest to the Beeline Highway. The highway was named for local resident Harvey Grandville Bush in the 1930s.

The road continues south beyond its terminus as Power Road, a major road within the cities of Mesa, Gilbert, and Queen Creek.

Route description
Bush Highway begins at the northern end of Power Road at the northern boundary of Mesa and continues northward. Near the Salt River, the roadway turns to the northeast into Tonto National Forest. The highway runs over the Arizona Canal and past the Granite Reef Dam. The highway continues along the Salt River near its confluence with the Verde River and past Red Mountain. It crosses the river on the Blue Point Bridge, which is a location used traditionally as the start of tubing trips down the river. From there, the road continues northerly past  the Stewart Mountain Dam and Saguaro Lake to connect with State Route 87 (Beeline Highway).

History
The highway was named after Harvey Granville Bush, a Mesa lumberman. Construction on what was then called "The Harvey Bush Highway" began on March 21, 1933. The road opened to the public in 1934.

Major intersections

See also

References

External links

 Tonto National Forest Recreation Areas

Roads in Arizona
Transportation in Maricopa County, Arizona